The 2023 season will be the 16th season for the Indian Premier League franchise Punjab Kings. They will be one of the ten teams compete in the 2023 Indian Premier League.

Background
In September 2022, Trevor Bayliss replaced Anil Kumble as the side's head coach. In November, Shikhar Dhawan replaced Mayank Agarwal as the captain.

Current squad 
 Players with international caps are listed in bold.

Administration and support staff

References

Cricket teams in India
2023 Indian Premier League
Punjab Kings seasons